Víctor Manuel Sánchez del Real (born 23 November 1969) is a Spanish businessman and politician who is a member of the 14th Congress of Deputies from the Vox party.

Biography
del Real was born in Ceuta and grew up in various locations around Spain due to his father's career as a military doctor. He was one of the original founding members of the Vox and has been the chief strategists and organizers for the party, but is considered by Spanish media to remain largely out of the spotlight in contrast to Vox's other leadership figures. He was the party's campaign coordinator for the 2018 Andalusian regional election, where Vox got its first parliamentarians.

He has served as a member of the Congress of Deputies since 2019 for the Badajoz constituency.

References

1969 births
Living people
Vox (political party) politicians
Members of the 13th Congress of Deputies (Spain)
Members of the 14th Congress of Deputies (Spain)